The 1970 New York Mets season was the ninth regular season for the Mets, who played home games at Shea Stadium. Led by manager Gil Hodges, the team had an 83–79 record and finished in third place in the National League's Eastern Division.

Offseason 
 December 3, 1969: Amos Otis and Bob Johnson were traded by the Mets to the Kansas City Royals for Joe Foy.

Regular season

Season standings

Record vs. opponents

Notable transactions 
 July 12, 1970: Don Cardwell was purchased from the Mets by the Atlanta Braves.

Roster

Player stats

Batting

Starters by position 
Note: Pos = Position; G = Games played; AB = At bats; H = Hits; Avg. = Batting average; HR = Home runs; RBI = Runs batted in

Other batters 
Note: G = Games played; AB = At bats; H = Hits; Avg. = Batting average; HR = Home runs; RBI = Runs batted in

Pitching

Starting pitchers 
Note: G = Games pitched; IP = Innings pitched; W = Wins; L = Losses; ERA = Earned run average; SO = Strikeouts

Other pitchers 
Note: G = Games pitched; IP = Innings pitched; W = Wins; L = Losses; ERA = Earned run average; SO = Strikeouts

Relief pitchers 
Note: G = Games pitched; W = Wins; L = Losses; SV = Saves; ERA = Earned run average; SO = Strikeouts

Awards and honors 
 Tommie Agee – Player of the Month, June 1970
All-Star Game

Farm system

Notes

References 
1970 New York Mets at Baseball Reference
1970 New York Mets team page at www.baseball-almanac.com

New York Mets seasons
New York Mets season
New York Mets
1970s in Queens